Halvor Moxnes (born 1944) is a Norwegian theologian.

He was born in Stokke on 13 September 1944. He received his Doctor of Theology degree in 1978 with the thesis Theology in Conflict: Studies in Paul's Understanding of God in Romans, and was appointed as a professor of the New Testament at the University of Oslo in 1984. In 2005 he received an honorary degree at the University of Copenhagen and he is also a member of the Norwegian Academy of Science and Letters. In 2006 ran for election as the dean of the Faculty of Theology, but lost to Trygve Wyller.

References

1944 births
20th-century Protestant theologians
Living people
Members of the Norwegian Academy of Science and Letters
Norwegian theologians
People from Stokke
Academic staff of the University of Oslo